Baş Şabalıd (also, Bash Shabalyt) is a village and municipality in the Shaki Rayon of Azerbaijan.  It has a population of 815.

References

External links 

Populated places in Shaki District